Gankhak-e Kowra (also Romanized as Gankhak-e Kowrā and Gonkhak-e Kowrā; also known as Kowrā and Kūrā) is a village in Kaki Rural District, Kaki District, Dashti County, Bushehr Province, Iran. At the 2006 census, its population was 293, in 55 families.

References 

Populated places in Dashti County